The 2004–05 Hong Kong First Division League season was the 93rd since its establishment.

League table

Fixture and results

Round 1

Round 2

Round 3

Round 4

Round 5

Round 6

Round 7

Round 8

Round 9

Round 10

Round 11

Round 12

Round 13

Round 14

Round 15

Round 16

Round 17

Round 18

References
 Hongkong 2004/05 – RSSSF

Hong Kong First Division League, 2004-05
Hong Kong First Division League seasons
First Division